The Midnight Line is a novel by British writer Lee Child. This is the twenty-second book in the Jack Reacher series. The book was released on 7 November 2017. The plot finds Reacher once again in the Midwest, this time being thrust into an investigation involving the illegal opioid trade, the pharmaceutical companies that often turn a blind eye in the name of profits, and the people dependent on them.

Plot summary
After spending the night with a woman named Michelle Chang (from Make Me), Jack Reacher is traveling through Wisconsin when he happens to stop at a pawnshop selling an unusual item: a 2005 West Point class ring. Unwilling to accept that such a priceless thing would be willingly sold, Jack suspects it to be stolen and decides against leaving town. He questions the pawnbroker and learns that the ring was sold to him by a biker named Jimmy Rat. Reacher beats up Rat's gang and learns that the ring originally belonged to a fence named Arthur Scorpio, who runs a laundromat in Rapid City, South Dakota. Reacher leaves town, aware that Rat has already warned Scorpio of his plans.

In Rapid City, Reacher encounters two other people with an interest in Scorpio: Gloria Nakamura, a detective who has tried and failed for years to find incriminating evidence of Scorpio's criminal enterprise, and Terrence Bramall, a private investigator hired by Tiffany Jane Mackenzie, a woman searching for her missing twin sister Serena Rose Sanderson, who Reacher learns, through a sympathetic general at West Point, is the owner of the ring. Reacher allows himself to be picked up by Scorpio's men and then subdues them in less than three seconds. In turn, Scorpio provides him with the name of Seymour Porterfield, the man who originally gave him the ring, but secretly instructs an associate of his, Billy, to kill Reacher before he finds Seymour.

Reacher travels to Mule Crossing, a rural town in Wyoming, where Porterfield last lived. A local shopkeep reveals that Sy has been dead for well over a year, supposedly killed by a wild bear. Bramall runs into Reacher at Billy's house, and the two agree to partner up, at least temporarily. They search Sy's house, and find evidence that a woman was living with him. Mackenzie shows up, having grown impatient with Bramall's lack of results, and Reacher reveals his growing suspicion that both Rose and Sy were involved with the illegal opioid trade, which is subsequently confirmed by Kirk Noble, a DEA agent who asks Reacher to keep him informed if he finds Rose or Billy.

While looking for a new lead on Rose's location, three junkies try to scare the group off, but Reacher intimidates them into leaving. The men turn out to be friends of Rose, and when Reacher convinces them that they mean no harm, they are taken to see Rose, who has been in hiding since an IED in Afghanistan shredded her face, leaving her disfigured and in constant pain, making her dependent on opioids. Fearing that her sister will die, Mackenzie formulates a plan to move her to her home in Illinois, where her addiction can be treated in secret. Before they can leave, Stackley, a dealer who has taken over Billy's operation following the latter's disappearance, bribes the junkies to kill Reacher.  One is accidentally shot and dies, and Reacher forces the others to lure Stackley into a trap; Rose manages to kill him with a rifle.

As Rose will likely die without a new supply of opioids, Reacher, Bramall, and Mackenzie steal what she needs from Stackley's suppliers, and Reacher cuts a deal with Noble to protect Rose from having to testify against the dealers on the DEA's behalf. Nakamura attempts to arrest Scorpio, who she realizes is the head of the operation, but he chains her to a table. Reacher then confronts Scorpio and stuffs him in a mechanical dryer, while the DEA receives sufficient information to complete their investigation. Reacher learns Seymour had been framed by a Col. Bateman, a corrupt Marine, for trying to expose his theft of military opioid supplies for resale to Scorpio. Seymour had committed suicide; Bateman was convicted for other wrongdoings some time before this story.

Reacher returns Rose's ring to her, and she promises to get clean before she, Bramall, and Mackenzie drive off. Reacher then hitches another ride out of South Dakota, heading towards Kansas.

References

External links

2017 British novels
English novels
Jack Reacher books
Novels about substance abuse
Works about the illegal drug trade
Delacorte Press books